Kallar  is the upper tributary of Vamanapuram River flowing through the Indian state of Kerala. The river originates in the Chemunjimotta hills (alt. 1860m) hills on the southern side of the Western Ghats, and flows entirely through Thiruvananthapuram district of Kerala.
The Meenmutty Falls and Lower Meenmutty dam are situated in this river.

References

See also 
 List of rivers of Tamil Nadu

Rivers of Tamil Nadu
Vellore district
Rivers of Thiruvananthapuram district
Rivers of India